Pratima Bose (18 June 1923 – 1985) was an Indian politician. She was a Member of Parliament, representing West Bengal in the Rajya Sabha the upper house of India's Parliament as a member of the Indian National Congress. Bose died in 1985.

References

1923 births
1985 deaths
Indian National Congress politicians from West Bengal
Rajya Sabha members from West Bengal
Women in West Bengal politics
Women members of the Rajya Sabha